Akephorus is a genus of beetles in the family Carabidae.

Species
The genus contains the following species:

 Akephorus marinus LeConte, 1852
 Akephorus obesus (LeConte, 1866)

References

Scaritinae